Gabriel Le Bras (1891-1970) was a French legal scholar and sociologist.

Early life
Gabriel Le Bras was born on July 23, 1891 in Paimpol, France. He received a Doctorate and the Agrégation in Laws in 1922.

Career
Le Bras was a Professor of Law at the University of Strasbourg from 1923 to 1929. He was director of research in the Sociology of Religion at the École pratique des hautes études from 1945 to 1962. He served as the Dean of the Law School at the University of Paris from 1959 to 1962.

Le Bras became a member of the Académie des Sciences Morales et Politiques in 1962.

Publications 
 (with Paul Fournier), Histoire des collections canoniques en occident depuis les Fausses Décrétales jusqu'au Décret de Gratien, 2 vol., Paris, 1931 ; 1932.
(including Prolégomènes, Paris, 1955)
 Introduction à l'histoire de la pratique religieuse en France, 2 vol., Paris, 1942 ; 1945. (read online).
 Études de sociologie religieuse, 2 vol., Paris, PUF, "Bibliothèque de Sociologie contemporaine", 1955 ; 1956.
 Institutions ecclésiastiques de la Chrétienté médiévale, 2 vol., Paris, Bloud & Gay, 1959 ; 1964.
 with Charles Lefebvre and J. Rambaud, L'Âge classique (1140–1378). Sources et théorie du droit, Paris, Sirey, 1965.
 L'Église et le village, Paris, Flammarion, 1976.
 La Police religieuse dans l'ancienne France, Paris, Fayard, 2010. (Read online).

Bibliography on Le Bras 
 Études d'histoire du droit canonique dédiées à Gabriel Le Bras, Paris, Sirey, 1965, 2 vol.
Francine Soubiran-Paillet. "Juristes et sociologues français d'après-guerre : une rencontre sans lendemain", Genèses. Sciences sociales et histoire, 2000, n° 1, .
Dominique Julia, "Un passeur de frontières : Gabriel Le Bras et l'enquête sur la pratique religieuse en France", RHEF, 92, 2006, .
 Raoul C. Van Caenegem, Legal historians I have known: a personal memoir, in: Rechtsgeschichte, Zeitschrift des Max-Planck Instituts für europäische Rechtsgeschichte, 2010, S.252-299.

References

1891 births
1970 deaths
French jurists
French sociologists
People from Paimpol
Academic staff of the University of Strasbourg
Academic staff of the University of Paris
Members of the Académie des sciences morales et politiques
Corresponding Fellows of the Medieval Academy of America
Corresponding Fellows of the British Academy